The following outline is provided as an overview of and topical guide to animation:

Animation – rapid display of a sequence of images of 2-D artwork or model positions in order to create an illusion of movement. It is an optical illusion of motion due to the phenomenon of persistence of vision.  The most common method of presenting animation is as a motion picture or video program, although several other forms of presenting animation also exist.

What type of thing is animation? 
Animation can be described as all of the following:

 One of the visual arts
Manipulation of imagery to give the appearance of movement

Animation techniques 

 Traditional Animation (2-dimensional)
 Full animation
 Limited animation
 Rotoscoping
 3D animation
 Stop Motion animation
 Clay animation
 Strata-cut animation
 Cutout animation
 Silhouette animation
 Model animation
 Go motion
 Object animation
 Brickfilm
 Graphic animation
 Pixilation
 Puppet animation
 Puppetoon
 Rendering (computer graphics)

History of animation 

History of American animation:
Animation in the United States during the silent era
Golden Age of American animation
World War II and American animation
Animation in the United States in the television era
Modern animation in the United States
History of anime
History of British animation
History of Canadian animation
History of Chinese animation
History of French animation
History of Hungarian animation
History of Iranian animation
History of Russian animation

Computer Animation Software 
 2D animation
 Adobe Flash
 3D animation
 Maya (software)
 3D Studio Max
 Lightwave
 ZBrush
 Rhinoceros 3D
 Cinema 4D
 Houdini (software)
 Blender (software)
 Softimage XSI

Animated films 
 Lists of animated films
 List of animated feature-length films
 List of animated television series
 List of computer-animated films
 List of animated short series
 List of animated shorts

Animation studios 

 List of animation studios

Some notable artists and producers of animation 

 Tex Avery
 Ralph Bakshi
 Hanna-Barbera
 Brad Bird
 Don Bluth
 Bob Clampett
 Quirino Cristiani
 Walt Disney
 Max Fleischer
 Paul Grimault
 Matt Groening
 Ivan Ivanov-Vano
 Chuck Jones
 Mike Judge
 John Kricfalusi
 Walter Lantz
 John Lasseter
 Todd McFarlane
 Hayao Miyazaki
 Joe Murray
 Fred Quimby
 Trey Parker
 Matt Stone
 Jay Ward

See also 

 Outline of film

External links 

 

 
 The making of an 8-minute cartoon short
 "Animando", a 12-minute film demonstrating 10 different animation techniques (and teaching how to use them).

 Outline
animation
animation